Bolo Hau is a 2021 Indian Hindi-language romantic drama film directed and produced by Tarun Dhanrajgir. The film's main cast is Adnan Sajid Khan, Jahnavi Dhanrajgir and Preeti Nigam.

Cast
Adnan Sajid Khan as Khursheed
Jahnavi Dhanrajgir as Rukhsar
Preeti Nigam as Rukhsar's mother
Ankit Rathi as Salman

References

External links 
 

2020s Hindi-language films